Windeyer may refer to:

People

Brian Windeyer Vice-Chancellor of London University (1969-72)
Charles Windeyer (1780–1855), Australian magistrate 
  Chris Windeyer, Canadian author
 Gordon Windeyer (born 1954), Australian high jumper
Margaret Windeyer (1866-1939), Australian librarian and women's rights campaigner
  Mary Elizabeth Windeyer (1837-1912), Australian women's rights campaigner
Richard Windeyer (1806–1847), barrister and Australian politician
Richard Windeyer (barrister) (1868–1959), Australian barrister
William Charles Windeyer (1834–1897), Australian politician and judge
  William John Victor Windeyer (1900–1987), Australian judge, soldier and educator
William Victor Windeyer, current judge of the Supreme Court of New South Wales

Places
Windeyer County, New South Wales, named after "the Windeyer brothers"
  Windeyer County, Queensland
  Windeyer Institute of Medical Science at University College London
  Windeyer Public School (List of Government schools in New South Wales: Q-Z#W)
  Windeyer, gold rush town between Mudgee and Hill End, NSW Australia